NBN Kanthararom United Football Club (Thai สโมสรฟุตบอลเอ็นบีเอ็น กันทรารมย์ ยูไนเต็ด), is a Thailand Association football club based Sisaket in Thailand. The club is currently playing in the 2018 Thailand Amateur League North Eastern Region.

Record

References

 http://daily.khaosod.co.th/view_news.php?newsid=TUROelkyc3dOREE1TURrMk1BPT0=&sectionid=TURNek5nPT0=&day=TWpBeE55MHdPUzB3T1E9PQ==
 http://www.thailive.net/2017/09/01/%E0%B8%AA%E0%B8%B9%E0%B9%89%E0%B9%80%E0%B8%9B%E0%B9%89%E0%B8%B2%E0%B8%AB%E0%B8%A1%E0%B8%B2%E0%B8%A2-%E0%B8%88%E0%B8%B5%E0%B8%A3%E0%B8%A7%E0%B8%B1%E0%B8%92%E0%B8%99%E0%B9%8C/

External links
 Official facebook

Association football clubs established in 2016
Football clubs in Thailand
2016 establishments in Thailand